Task Force White Eagle (in Polish referred as Polskie Siły Zadaniowe (Polish Task Force)) was a brigade sized detachment of Polish Land Forces in Ghazni Province, Afghanistan. The brigade was under the command of the US 1st Cavalry Division. 30 October 2008 Polish forces taking over responsibility for Ghazni province. Throughout the activity of the Polish contingent in Afghanistan occurred fighting with the Taliban and other rebels. Polish troops took part in many military operations. During the mission 44 Polish soldiers were killed.

Structures

The brigade was divided into two major elements. The kinetic element consisted of units that are going into direct contact with the enemy and the non-kinetic element consists of support and logistic units.

 Kinetic elements
 Battle Group A (battalion sized) - FOB Ghazni, FB Four Corners
 1st Mechanized Infantry Company (five infantry platoons)
 2nd Mechanized Infantry Company (five infantry platoons)
 Logistic Company
 Engineering Group
 Battle Group B (battalion sized) - FOB Warrior, FB Giro, COP Qarabagh
 1st Mechanized Infantry Company (five infantry platoons)
 2nd Mechanized Infantry Company (five infantry platoons)
 Logistic Company
 Engineering Group
 Special Operations Group - FOB Ghazni (JW Komandosów TF50, JW Grom TF49)
 Reconnaissance Group - COP Ajiristan
 Independent Air Group - FOB Ghazni

 Non-kinetic elements
 Psychological Operations Group
 Civil-Military Co-operation Group
 1st Tactical Support Group
 2nd Tactical Support Group
 Operational Mentoring & Liaison Team no 1 (3rd Brigade, 203rd Corps ANA)
 Operational Mentoring & Liaison Team no 2 (1st battalion, 3rd Brigade, 203rd Corps ANA)
 Operational Mentoring & Liaison Team no 3 (2nd battalion, 3rd Brigade, 203rd Corps ANA)
 Provincial Reconstruction Team Ghazni (USA/POL)
 Agriculture Development Team Ghazni (USA)
 Medical Support Group - FOB Ghazni
 National Support Element - FOB Ghazni
 Detached Logistic Support Group
 Forward Surgical Teams (USA) - FOB Ghazni

Size

Equipment

The basic combat vehicle of Battle Groups is KTO Rosomak in various variants. Rosomak is complemented by Cougar H (MRAP) (from late 2008) and HMMWV leased from the USA. Lightly armored HMMWVs are used only in situations that exclude use of heavier vehicles. Fire support is provided by 98mm M-98 mortars and 152mm Dana howitzers. Air support is provided by Independent Air Group using Mi-17 and Mi-24 helicopters as well as UAVs. From 2010 there were used MaxxPro MRAP, followed by Oshkosh M-ATV.

See also

 List of NATO installations in Afghanistan
 List of Afghan Armed Forces installations

References

Military units and formations of Poland
Military units and formations of the War in Afghanistan (2001–2021)